Arthur W. Sladen  (October 28, 1860 – February 28, 1914) was a Major League Baseball outfielder. He played for the 1884 Boston Reds in the Union Association.  He appeared in two games for the Reds, and was hitless in seven at-bats.

Sources

Major League Baseball outfielders
Boston Reds (UA) players
Baseball players from Massachusetts
19th-century baseball players
1860 births
1914 deaths
People from Dracut, Massachusetts
Sportspeople from Middlesex County, Massachusetts